is a Japanese R&B and pop singer. Since his debut, Hirai has worked as a model, actor, composer, lyricist, singer, and brand ambassador.

During his career, Hirai has released 45 singles and nine studio albums as of January 2019. According to Oricon, his single Hitomi o Tojite (Close Your Eyes) became the best-selling single of 2004 in Japan, while his compilation album Ken Hirai 10th Anniversary Complete Single Collection '95–'05 "Utabaka" became the best-selling album of 2006 in Japan.

Early life 
Born on January 17, 1972, in Higashiōsaka, Osaka, Ken Hirai grew up in Nabari, Mie.

Career

1995–2000 
Signing with Sony, he released his first single in 1995, but to no great success. Hirai used the next four years to consolidate his style and take time out – he only released one single each in 1997 and 1998 and did not produce any new music during 1999. Fans waited until 2000 for a third album from Hirai, The Changing Same. It was the first single, that established him as a major player in the Japanese sales charts and overseas. Hirai was voted "Best New Japanese Act" in a pop poll organized by the RTHK radio station in Hong Kong.

2001–2003 
Hirai's 1st remix album, Kh Re-mixed Up 1 was released on November 28, 2001. Through the album, the artist showed a new part of himself to the audience, which appealed to club-goers and DJs for the first time. In the summer of that same year, Hirai earned the title of Best Male Artist at the inaugural MTV Video Music Awards Japan, and appeared at the official FIFA World Cup 2002 concert with Chemistry and Lauryn Hill.

A popular nursery rhyme, it was expected to be a minor success, but went on to become one of the biggest hits of the year.

In 2003, Hirai performed for MTV Unplugged Live in New York, as the first Japanese male solo vocalist. He was also interviewed by CNN The Music Room, which was televised in 210 countries, and watched by 230 million viewers. His 5th album Life Is..., which contains "Strawberry Sex", "Ring", and his hit single "Ōki na Furudokei", was released on January 22, 2003.

On December 1, 2003, a concept album, Ken's Bar, was released. On the album, Hirai selected favorite songs and covered them in his own style. The music was primarily jazz oriented, but covers of many blues numbers were present as well.

2004–2006 
In May 2004, Hirai launched his next album, Sentimentalovers. The album spawned four singles, with  being the most successful, becoming the highest-selling single of that year.

Hirai's 2005 single, "Pop Star", was one of his career's biggest hits, spawning multiple imitations and reaching Number One on the Oricon Charts. The video for the song, which featured Hirai playing 7 different characters and animals, became an instant hit. A cover of the song was featured on the rhythm game Moero! Nekketsu Rhythm Damashii Osu! Tatakae! Ouendan 2 for the Nintendo DS, and Namco popular drumming game Taiko no Tatsujin 8.

2007–2011 
In 2007, Hirai released two singles. Both singles peaked at number 5 on the Oricon charts and sold around 100,000 copies. The first of these was "Elegy", followed by "Kimi no Suki na Toko (Why I Love You)". "Elegy" was a major radio success in Japan.

In August 2007, Hirai released his 27th single, titled "Fake Star", along with a music video that was considered a huge departure for the star due to its risqué subject material.

On February 20, 2008, Hirai released his 28th and 1st double A-side single, titled "Canvas/Kimi wa Suteki (You're Wonderful)". The singles debuted at number 6 on the Oricon charts.

"Canvas" is used as the insert and ending theme song to Fuji TV's Hachimitsu to Clover drama, which is based on a popular manga. It was written and composed by Hirai, and arranged by Tomita Keichi, as with Hirai's 17th single, "Ring".

On March 12, 2008, Hirai released his seventh studio album, Fakin' Pop. Fakin' Pop is Hirai's first studio offering since 2004's Sentimentalovers.

Hirai released his 29th single,  on April 23, 2008. The song is a recut single from Fakin' Pop and was the theme song for the Japanese drama .

On May 27, 2009, Hirai released Ken's Bar II, continuing the concept of creating jazz covers of his favorite Japanese and English songs. He held a 2009 summer concert tour in Japan under the same name.

On September 23, 2009, Hirai released his 30th single, "Candy".

On October 21, Hirai's 31st and latest single, titled , was released.

On October 13, 2010, Hirai's 32nd single "Sing Forever" was released. His 33rd single coming out on November 10, 2010, is called "Aishiteru," followed by a new compilation entitled 'Ken Hirai 15th Anniversary c/w Collection '95–'10 "Ura Utabaka"' to celebrate his fifteen years being a singer in the music industry. The compilation includes all the b-sides starting from the first single "Precious Junk."

On May 4, 2011, Hirai released a new single "いとしき日々よ"「for the Japan TV mega hit TV drama JIN-仁

On June 8, 2011, Hirai released his ninth studio album, Japanese Singer. Three years later, in 2014, he released the third in his series of song covers, Ken's Bar III, and a collaborative single with Namie Amuro called GROTESQUE.

On July 6, 2016, Ken Hirai released his tenth studio album "The Still Life, featuring the Singles, Kokuhaku" (告白, "Love Confession")Grotesque" (グロテスク Gurotesuku)"Onnaji Samishisa" (おんなじさみしさ, "The Same Sadness")"Soredemo Shitai" (ソレデモシタイ, "Still Want to")"Plus One""Time" and Mahotte Itte Ii Kana?" (魔法って言っていいかな?, "Could We Call It Magic?")

Discography 

Un-balanced (1995)
Stare At (1996)
The Changing Same (2000)
Gaining Through Losing (2001)
Life Is... (2003)
Sentimentalovers (2004)
Fakin' Pop (2008)
Japanese Singer (2011)
The Still Life (2016)

References

External links 

 Ken Hirai – Official website
 Ken Hirai – Ken Hirai Official website by PINUPS artist Inc. 
 Nippop Profile
 En Francais : French Multimedia Site

1971 births
Living people
People from Higashiōsaka
People from Mie Prefecture
Japanese male singer-songwriters
Japanese male pop singers
Japanese rhythm and blues singers
Defstar Records artists
Musicians from Mie Prefecture
Musicians from Osaka Prefecture
20th-century Japanese male singers
20th-century Japanese singers
21st-century Japanese male singers
21st-century Japanese singers